The United States Air Force Academy Cadet Wing (AFCW) is the student body of the United States Air Force Academy. The students, called "cadets", are divided into four classes, based on their year in school, much like a civilian college. They are not referred to as freshmen, sophomores, juniors and seniors, however, but as fourth-, third-, second- and first class cadets, respectively. Fourth class cadets (freshmen) are sometimes referred to as "doolies," a term derived from the Greek word δοῦλος ("doulos") meaning "slave" or "servant." Members of the three lower classes are also referred to as "4 degrees," "3 degrees" or "2 degrees" (or "4-degs", 3-degs", and "2-degs" respectively) based on their class. First-class cadets (seniors) are referred to as "firsties." In the military structure of the Cadet Wing, first class cadets hold the positions of cadet officers, second class cadets act as the cadet non-commissioned officers and third class cadets represent the cadet junior non-commissioned officers.

Leadership
The wing is commanded by the “Wing Top 3”, led by the Cadet Wing Commander (AFCW/CC), the highest ranking first-class cadet, with the Cadet Vice Wing Commander (AFCW/CV) and the Cadet Wing Director of Operations (AFCW/DO).

The Cadet Wing Commander is responsible for the daily operations of the 4,000+ member Wing. The Wing Commander reports directly to the Commandant of Cadets and advises him/her on major command decisions. The Wing Commander supervises the Vice Wing Commander, Cadet Wing Director of Operations, and four Cadet Group Commanders, who in turn each supervise ten Cadet Squadron Commanders. The Wing Commander also commands the wing staff who assist him/her with the creation and implementation of command policy. Among cadets, the Wing Commander is referred to as the “Wing King” or “Wing Queen”.

The Cadet Wing Director of Operations is a senior cadet responsible for the day-to-day operation, readiness, and discipline of the Wing and holds the rank of C/Col, the highest firstie rank. The Wing Director of Operations also oversees the Cadet Wing Operations Center The cadet who fills this position is often referred as the “Wing D.O.” among cadets. The chief administrator of the cadet discipline system, authorizing and monitoring demerit, tours, and confinement work, he or she also implements military, academic, athletic, standardization/evaluation, and training programs. Lastly, the “Wing D.O.” is in charge of approving the distribution of the daily Routine Order to the Cadet Wing.

Squadrons
When the first class entered the academy in the summer of 1955, they were divided into four squadrons. In the years following, the number of squadrons gradually increased at an average of four to eight per year. By 1970, the size in the cadet wing reached its peak of 40 squadrons. The number of squadrons dipped from 40 to 36 in 1999 but returned to its current strength of 40 squadrons in 2006.

Cadet groups 
Cadet Group One consists of Squadrons 1–10.

Cadet Group Two consists of Squadrons 11–20.

Cadet Group Three consists of Squadrons 21–30.

Cadet Group Four consists of Squadrons 31–40.

Air Force Cadet Wing Squadron 1 "Mighty Mach One" 

The emblem in the shape of a spearhead and bordered in black, has two colored fields, the upper green and the lower black. A black diagonal strip edged in white separates the fields. A black Maltese cross trimmed in white is on the green field and a gold griffin is on the black field. "First Takes Care of its Own" is written in black letters on a gold scroll beneath the black field.

The griffin, a creature in Greek mythology, seeks hidden treasure while protecting its own treasure from intruders. The griffin symbolizes the search for the treasure from intruders. The griffin symbolizes the search for the treasure of knowledge in areas yet unknown and unexplored. The Maltese Cross, awarded to the bravest and most courageous military men, indicates a devotion to duty and a dedication to success. The cross, positioned above the black diagonal strip, indicates a higher ideal in life to which one should strive.

The emblem is fashioned after the famous 1st Fighter Wing, the original squadron sponsor. The colors green, gold and black, the Maltese Cross and the diagonal strip are similar to the 1st Fighter Wing emblem.

Air Force Cadet Wing Squadron 2 "Deuce"

Their squadron saying is "Delta Tau Deuce."

The squadron's patch is a large circular emblem with a thin silver border. A banner inscribed with the word "DEUCE" sits on top of the circle. From a white contrail on a black field emerges the Roman numeral II. A red and blue contrail, produced by two jet aircraft frame the white contrail.

The red, white, and blue contrails represent the colors of the American flag while the black background signifies the vastness of space. The contrails symbolize three areas in which all cadets strive to excel: military, academics, and athletics.

The patch, designed and first used by the Second Cadet Squadron in 1972, is the third patch worn by its members.

Air Force Cadet Wing Squadron 3 "Dogs of War"

Circular in design, this royal blue patch is edged with a black border. The prominent feature is a lunging, silver, three-headed dog. Behind the dog are three red columns resting on a red pedestal. Across the tops of the columns is a red lintel bearing the word "Cerberus." Silver bands edge the base and the top of each of the three columns. Behind the columns is a yellow fire accented with red.

Cerberus is the gods’ three-headed watchdog with the tail of a dragon or a serpent; the three heads symbolize the qualities of loyalty, obedience and fearlessness. The Roman numeral III links the squadron's number and heritage to one of the greatest professional armies of all time. It also represents the gate that Cerberus guards. Fire, traditionally a symbol of eternity, represents the eternal and undying nature of the ideals of the Third Squadron.

The "Cerberus Three" patch replaced the original Third Squadron patch in 1977

Air Force Cadet Wing Squadron 4 "Fightin' Fourth"

The squadron's patch is centered around a Prop and Wings in the foreground approaching from an infinite distance.  The Prop and Wings is at the center of a blue, black and gold blast.  A red number 4 is dominantly displayed in the upper right, adjacent to the white banner that reads "Fightin' Fourth" in black letters.  The colors Gold, and Blue are present in the blast, the color Silver in the Prop and Wings and the color Red in the number 4.  These colors are the 4 class colors of the academy, representing the squadrons inclusion of all four classes in all they do, and they also contain the colors of the American flag. The Prop and Wings are an insignia of the upperclass cadet at the academy, representing the squadrons quest to rise above the rest of the wing.

The "4" identifies the Fourth Cadet Squadron. The blast is a symbol of strength and dominance.  The contrails originating from the background at infinity to the Prop and Wings in the foreground represent the long, infinite struggle for "Excellence in All We Do," an Air Force Core Value.

The patch was designed in 1959, by the class of 1963.  Cadet Squadron Four is one of the few squadrons at the academy that still has the same original name, and patch.  The squadron name "Fightin' Fourth" is the only squadron name not chosen by the squadron itself, but picked by cadets in the rest of wing.  In 1959, when the academy was still at Lowry Air Force Base, Cadet Squadron Four defended the academy mascot, the falcon, from a visiting athletic team's prank.  The squadron was given the name "Fightin' Fourth," which has stuck to this day.

Air Force Cadet Wing Squadron 5 "Wolf Pack"

The squadron saying is "Feed 'em to the wolves," often shortened to "Feed 'em!"

The patch is a blue circle bordered in black. A snarling black and gray wolf's head dominates the center of the patch and a red Roman numeral "V" is located directly behind the wolf's head. "Wolf Pack" is written in yellow on the blue ribbon at the top of the patch and 5th SQAFCW is written in yellow on the bottom ribbon.

The patch signifies the squadron's association with the famous "Wolfpack" Fighter wing, led in Southeast Asia by Brigadier General Robin Olds; the fierceness, professionalism and dedication to duty demonstrated by the wing is emulated the Fifth Squadron Cadets. The snarling wolf indicates the cunning and tenacity used by Gen Olds’ forces and the high degree of spirit they demonstrated.

This is the third patch in the squadron's history.

Air Force Cadet Wing Squadron 6 "Bull Six"

The bright red patch, a circle bordered in white, shows a large, boldly printed white "6" located in the center. A ferocious black bull, snorting a white cloud, leaps through the circular opening at the bottom of the six.

The huge black bull, the Sixth Squadron's mascot symbolizes strength, courage, determination, perseverance and tenacity. The bright red background, as well as the red eyes and horns, adds to the glory of the bull and symbolize courage and vigor.

This is the original squadron patch.

Air Force Cadet Wing Squadron 7 "Shadow Seven"
The patch is a royal blue equilateral triangle, bordered in gold, standing on its vertex. A white unicorn, its features outlined in blue, stands in the center. A golden lightning bolt overlaps the unicorn and forms the shape of a large seven.

The large and powerful unicorn signifies strength. This mythological animal was virtually invincible in battle. The blue field behind the unicorn stands for fidelity and relates the Seventh Squadron to the Air Force. The gold border stands for valor and its golden rewards. The seven, shaped from a lightning bolt, symbolizes the speed with which the Air Force strikes in battle.

This is the original squadron patch.

Air Force Cadet Wing Squadron 8 "Eagle Eight"
The patch, a large white circle bordered in dark blue, shows a multicolored F-15 Eagle in its center. "EAGLE" is printed in dark blue across the top of the aircraft. A dark blue "8" is at the bottom. Four stars—colored gold, blue, silver, and red—sit on the right-hand side of the emblem.

The Eighth Squadron chose the F-15 for its emblem for two reasons: The F-15 was the newest interceptor in the Air Force inventory, and the words eagle and eight begin with the same letter. The ghost gray color, along with the plane's leading edge, is the color used by the Air Force Aggressor squadrons. The four colored stars represent the four classes at the academy. The patch symbolizes Eighth Squadron's aggressiveness in intercepting and destroying its enemies.

This fourth patch worn by the squadron was approved in July 1975.

Air Force Cadet Wing Squadron 9 "Viking Nine"
The patch is an octagonal-shaped emblem. Within it, a Viking ship braves the open sea with a bright orange-rayed sun in the background. A navy blue flag flies from a mast stretching upward from the deck of the ship, while the word "VIKING," also stamped in blue, is proudly displayed to the left of the flag. A large white sail, bordered in black, billows from the mast. The Roman numeral "IX" is centered on the sail in oversized red font. The prow of the ship is a carved dragon head (tinted in emerald green) signifying the vessel of a military commander.

The "IX" represents the Ninth Cadet Squadron. The dragon symbolizes the absolute fearlessness, power, and audacity that characterized the Vikings. As the most fearsome warriors of their era, the Vikings expanded their range with unmatched boldness and were among the first warriors to discover North America. Like their namesake, squadron 9 cadets embody boldness, courage, and determination.

This third patch in the squadron's history was approved for wear in January 1978. The original Viking design carried the “nine” theme through to several elements, including nine scales on the dragon and nine shields on the side of the ship.

Air Force Cadet Wing Squadron 10 "Tiger Ten"
The patch is a circle of sky blue bordered in black. It shows the head of snarling tiger at its center. Four white lightning bolts spring from the tiger's head. A white cloud sits immediately above the tiger's head, and a white Arabic numeral "10" is at the bottom of the patch.

The tiger, the supreme symbol of tenacity and aggressiveness, was chosen by the 10th Squadron to symbolize the tradition of the Flying Tigers of World War II. The four lightning bolts correlate to the four classes of the academy and symbolize power while the cloud represents the horizons open to members of the squadron.

This is the original squadron patch. There may be a distinct color variation—a dark blue background—on one version.

Air Force Cadet Wing Squadron 11 "Rebeleven"
The squadron's patch consists of a white equilateral triangle, bordered in red, superimposed on a circular blue field. A red Arabic numeral "11" sits on silver prop and wings at the center.

The triangle superimposed upon the circle is borrowed from the 6th Bomb Wing, the original squadron sponsor. The silver prop and wings symbolize the cadet wing, while the large "11" identified the 11th Cadet Squadron. The emblem bears the squadron's red and white colors; the gold, blue, silver and red class colors; and the cadet wing's blue and silver colors.

Air Force Cadet Wing Squadron 12 “Dirty Dozen” 
The patch, an isosceles triangle of sky blue bordered in blue, is dominated by a black and white Polaris star. Behind the star, a jet plane takes off into the blue skies. The airfield below is a checkered design with black and silver squares in the foreground, blue and black squares in the second row, gold and black squares in the third row, and red and black going on into the distance. Printed in blue across the bottom of the triangle on a silver back is "12th Squadron."

The Polaris provides a never-failing light to guide cadets on their flight through life. It also serves as a reminder that no goal in life is too high to attain. The aircraft in the background signifies the profession cadets have chosen; its position in flight symbolizes the beginning of their mission to defend and protect their country. The four colors represent the four classes. The checkerboard pattern is the traditional symbol of the original squadron sponsors, the 401st Tactical Fighter Wing.

This, the original patch, was designed by William R. Povilus, class of 1963. Color variations of the patch may exist.

Air Force Cadet Wing Squadron 13 "Bulldawgs" 
The patch has a bulldog emblazoned in the foreground of a sky blue circle outlined in black. A lightning bolt shoots across the sky behind the silver bulldog, outlined in black and wearing a spiked collar. On a white scroll at the bottom of the patch is written "13th SQ AFCW."

The bulldog represents the full circle of qualities that make up an Air Force officer. It epitomizes the loyalty, moral resolve, and dogged pursuit of duty typical to the cadets of the 13th Squadron. The lightning bolt demonstrates the courage, dedication, and strength that characterizes all bulldog graduates.

This is the original squadron patch. Early versions of this patch may have a darker blue background. Another possibility is a lighter blue background with a brown bulldog.

Air Force Cadet Wing Squadron 14 "Cobras" 
The patch, a rounded white trapezoid with a light blue border, shows the upper body and head of an aroused cobra rising from the lower left to the upper right corner. The snake's head and prominent features, such as the scales on the head, body, tongue and eyes, are outlines in black. Its head is rust and gold; the body and border on the small head flanges are gold; the eyes and tongue are dark red. A simulates advanced manned strategic aircraft circles from right to left behind the cobra's head, crossing in front of the left hood flange and middle of the planed outlines in black. The Arabic numeral "14," in light blue with white shading, sits against the right flange of the cobra.

The cobra was chosen for its lightning speed and ability. The colors represent the four classes. The effectiveness and air superiority of the Air Force are illustrated in this patch. The aircraft is flying around the cobra’s head- eluding the snake despite its blinding speed and agility in battle. It also reminds cadets to beware of the abilities of one’s opponents.

This third patch was adopted by the squadron in August 1971.

Air Force Cadet Wing Squadron 15 "War Eagles" 
The patch depicts a crowned, black Prussian eagle in the Espanie, with its head turned toward the dexter.  A diamond-shaped aircraft is located on the eagle's chest. The eagle clutches a bundle of five sky blue arrows in its left talon and a sky blue sword in its right.

The blade and five arrows represent fifteen and symbolize preparedness, power, and strength. The eagle represents the Prussian military traditions of excellence and professionalism. The squadron motto "Plus Oultre" ("Further Beyond" in French) is found on a sky blue ribbon at the bottom.

This is the original squadron patch, designed by Cadet Joe Hans Robert Wilson, Class of 1963. The squadron was established in 1960. In 1969 and 1970, the 15th Squadron received the Aerospace Defense Command Award for Military Proficiency. Notable graduates include Nicole Malachowski, the first woman to fly as part of the Thunderbirds.

Air Force Cadet Wing Squadron 16 "Chicken Hawks" 
The patch, in the shape of a keystone edged in dark blue, consists of a silver and white hawk on a blue background. A gold lightning bolt is clutched in the bird's talons. The hawk's chest bears a small deep blue keystone with the squadron numeral "16" on it.

The hawk, with its outstretched wings, expresses the freedom of flight. The bared talons clutching the lightning bolt exemplify the power that one must possess to maintain one's freedom. This serves as a constant reminder that the Air Force must maintain a high degree of readiness to use force, if necessary, to protect freedom. The blue keystone signifies the knowledge one must possess to remain free.

This original squadron patch was designed in 1963 by David M. Connaughton, class of 1965.

Air Force Cadet Wing Squadron 17 "Stalag 17" 
The patch, a blue diamond-shaped emblem bordered in red, has a banner at its vertex. In the diamond, a clenched silver fist holds a silver torch with a bright orange and red flame. An emerald green wreath encircles both the torch and fist. The solid banner at the bottom contains the inscription "17th Squadron."

The clenched fist signifies power and persistence. The flaming torch represents the drive for knowledge, wisdom, and truth. The emerald green wreath encircling the fist exemplifies the laurels of athletic achievement. Each of the four class colors is represented to signify the importance of unity of all the classes at the academy.

This is the original squadron patch.

Air Force Cadet Wing Squadron 18 "Nightriders" 
The patch is a light blue circle bordered in red, superimposed on a black and white equilateral triangle. A large black unicorn with a white mane, red horn and green eye is within the circle. A green Arabic numeral "18" highlighted in red sits to the unicorn's left. A red rook is below the numeral and "ATTENDEZ LES ETALONS" is emblazoned in green across the bottom half of the circle. A large white cumulus cloud stretching across the horizon is located above the line.

The unicorn symbolizes strength, endurance and matchless spirit. The rook represents the academy as a fortress of knowledge. The three points on the triangle signify the three aspects of academy life: Military, academic, and athletic. The clouds show the military and aerospace careers open to graduates of the academy. "Watch for the stallions" is the English translation of the French "ATTENDEZ LES ETALONS."

This is the original squadron patch.

Air Force Cadet Wing Squadron 19 "Wolverines" 
The patch is a navy blue circle with an inner white circle. An aggressive wolverine head is featured prominently in the center of the patch. The number 19 in a black sans serif font is above the snout of the wolverine.

The wolverine characterizes the fierceness, confidence, and strength of Squadron 19. Its snarl is a warning to the adversary that the Air Force does not surrender. The yellow, blue, silver, and red colors on the patch represent the unity of the four academy classes.

The squadron was originally known as "Playboy 19" with a squadron patch that represented the official Playboy Bunny emblem, perhaps with the endorsement of Hugh Hefner himself.  The first USAFA class that introduced 150 female cadets, the Class of 1980, was slated to arrive in the summer of 1976.  As a result, the Playboy logo was deemed inappropriate and the squadron became known as "Starship 19," perhaps due to renewed popularity of the television series "Star Trek" in the mid-1970's. The patch displayed the Starship Enterprise with the words, "Starship 19" along the top of the patch and "Where no man has gone before" along the bottom. Sometime later, the term "Where no man has gone before" was deemed sexist and the squadron then transitioned to the generic "Wolverines."

Air Force Cadet Wing Squadron 20 "Tough Twenty Trolls" 
The patch is a royal blue circle bordered in black. An aggressive, strong troll stands in the middle. This troll strongly resembles the Hulk of the original comic book series. The green troll wears black trousers highlighted in violet. He is striding forward, stepping over the bright red three dimensional Roman numeral "XX." "TROLLS" is inscribed behind the troll.

Considered the “Can Do” cadets, Squadron 20 chose the Hulk to represent this attitude. As a symbol of robust strength and craftiness, the Hulk represents the need of the Air Force for skill of mind and body. The patch signifies the desire to succeed while maintaining a sense of humor.

This patch (Twentieth Squadron's second) was adopted in 1972.

Air Force Cadet Wing Squadron 21 "Blackjacks" 
The circular patch shows two playing cards, the ace of spades on top of the jack of spades, centered on a green field. The white numerals "21" sit beneath the cards. The patch has a black border.

The ace and jack of spades form the winning combination of twenty-one in the card game, Black Jack, thus they note both the squadron's number and nickname. This winning hand symbolizes the ingredients of character necessary to attain success: skill, spirit, ability, and fellowship. The green background represents the combined colors of gold and blue, the colors of the two classes that were involved in the patch's design. This mixture provides the incentive for cooperation between classes.

Grant D. Callin, class of 1963, was the principal designer of the emblem.

Air Force Cadet Wing Squadron 22 "Raptors" 
The patch is a triangle with a three-dimensional "22" in the upper part of its red field. A sabre with navigator wings on its center and globe on the end of its hilt points toward the center of the field. Eight red, gold, blue and silver rays emanate from the center of the patch.

The emblem's triangle shape compares the squadron's strength and solidarity to one of the sturdiest geometrical shapes--the triangle. The dominant red color symbolizes courage. The sabre, with the navigator's badge and globe, represents strength and readiness. The colored light rays, converging to a point on the horizon, signify unity among the four classes of the cadet wing.

This is the squadron's original patch.

Air Force Cadet Wing Squadron 23 "Barnstormers" 
The patch is a red-bordered triangle with rounded corners. The top and bottom sections of the patch contain a black field, while the left and right sections are red. A knight's head is in the top section. The beginning of a square knot and the words "23rd SQUADRON," in red, are on the bottom.

Named after the daring pioneers of American commercial and military aviation, Squadron 23 cadets aim to achieve the fearlessness of their namesake. The helmet symbolizes strength and honor while the overlapping loops signify the barnstormer’s aerial stunts.

Air Force Cadet Wing Squadron 24 "Phantoms" 
The patch depicts an eagle on a blue, inverted triangle with black borders. The black and white eagle, clutching a gold lightning bolt, soars above a white globe. A Polaris star, surrounded by two atomic rings, shines above the eagle. The gold numeral "24" is directly below.

The eagle symbolizes the virtues of strength, courage, and character each cadet strives to attain. The lightning bolt represents the global responsiveness of the Air Force. Polaris acts as a guiding light to cadets in their pursuit of knowledge. The atom symbolizes the predominant role of knowledge and science in the modern Air Force.

This is the squadron's original patch.

Air Force Cadet Wing Squadron 25 "Redeye" 
The patch is a circle containing a blue field bordered in gold. At the base of the circle is the squadron's number expressed in a red Roman numeral accented with black. A black cat with one red eye stands atop the numeral. Two fighters, flying in formation from right to left across the patch, execute a climbing turn and leave gold contrails.

The 25th Squadron is nicknamed after the Redeye missile; the black cat with a single red eye symbolizes this. "Redeye" typifies the unerring accuracy of the squadron in reaching its goals. The blue background symbolizes the sky. The two fighters in formation signify comradeship. The gold contrails left by the fighters indicate that this comradeship is long-lasting and follows cadets into the Air Force.

This is the squadron's original patch.

Air Force Cadet Wing Squadron 26 "Barons" 
The patch depicts Snoopy wearing a gold World War I flying helmet and sitting on his sliver dog house atop a bright green hill. The large red numeral "26" is displayed on a blue sky above Snoopy. White clouds form above the numerals. "BARONS" is written in red letters at the bottom of the patch.

Charles Schulz's familiar comic strip character was chosen because of his doggedness in getting the job done--despite constant setback in his pursuit of the Red Baron. Snoopy continually comes back for more, setting a fine example for the cadets of the 26th. The patch also represents the Air Force's air power heritage and contains the four class colors.

This is the squadron's original patch. A variation may exist without the "BARONS" tab.

Air Force Cadet Wing Squadron 27 "Thunderbirds" 
The central item of the patch is a fierce representation of a thunderbird on a black bordered triangular field of silver. The triangle sits on a blue, white-bordered, circular field. The thunderbird, bright yellow and outlined in royal blue, has three black concentric triangles superimposed on his chest. The numeral "27" is emblazoned on the bird's tail feathers, directly below the triangles. This signifies that the squadron is the 27th cadet squadron of the USAFA Cadet Wing

The thunderbird, a symbol to the early Native Americans inhabiting Colorado, ruled the skies. Since it could produce thunder, lightning and rain, the thunderbird represents the Air Force's dominance of the skies. The silver triangle is a stylized aircraft and the three concentric triangles represent three cubed, or twenty-seven. The patch contains the four academy colors to represent the unity of the wing.

This original patch of the squadron was designed by Donald S. Bowers, Jr., class of 1970.

Air Force Cadet Wing Squadron 28 "Blackbirds" 
The patch has an irregular gold pentagon on a yellow-edged blue circle. A stylized SR-71, with a white "28" on it, is centered on the pentagon. Two black lines emanate from the nose of the aircraft and extend to the edges of the pentagon.

The pentagon represents the future Air Force leadership being developed at the Air Force Academy. The stylized SR-71 signifies the search for knowledge and the dedication to the pursuit of national goals. From this aircraft the 28th Squadron once derived its nickname, "Blackbirds." The color gold symbolizes the excellence demanded of Air Force officers.

This is the squadron's original patch. A variation may exist with a white scroll at the bottom of the patch.

Air Force Cadet Wing Squadron 29 "Black Panthers" 
The patch is a white circle with a gold border. The central figure, a black panther, crouches on the top horizontal bar of the red Roman numeral "XXIX."

The black panther represents the quick strength and cunning of the Air Force; its crouched stance is a reminder that the Air Force is always ready. The white background symbolizes the virtue and nobility of humankind. The red Roman numeral symbolizes the fact that war has existed since antiquity, and the mission of the Air Force is to defend the country.

The patch was designed by George G. Wauer, Class of 1968. This is the squadron's original patch.

Air Force Cadet Wing Squadron 30 "Knights of Thirty" 
The patch is a circle with a knight's helmet, topped with a four-color plume, in the center. A stylized black and white aircraft leaves a contrail on a blue field to the helmet's left. To its right, the red numeral "30" sits amid red-highlighted yellow flames on a black field.

The knight's helmet represents the military profession--cadet's heritage. The four-colored plume symbolizes the four classes. The flames stand for war, to which the helmet is impervious. The ascending aircraft on the left suggests freedom of the skies and a peaceful contrast to the flames of war.

This is the squadron's original patch. It may be found with variations in the blue colors.

Air Force Cadet Wing Squadron 31 "Grim Reapers"
The squadron patch was approved in 1972 and features a turquoise circle bordered in black. "Grim Reaper" holds the gold "XXXI" by a chain in his right hand and a scythe in his left. The eponymous mythical character represented on the patch is borrowed from the insignia of the 13th Bomb Squadron and is emblematic of the reality of death in war, with which all aspiring warriors must come to terms.  The patch has been challenged multiple times in the history of the squadron but has always survived due to its strong lineage and the support of the Cadet Wing at large.

This is the squadron's original patch.

Air Force Cadet Wing Squadron 32 "Road Runners" 
The patch, bordered in dark green and white, is an emerald green with an aircraft and its contrails are in the center. The dark red inscription "Roadrunners" is at the top. The Roadrunner, a cartoon character, and the bright orange numeral "32" dominate the field. The squadron motto, "Catch Us If You Can," is on the bottom of the patch.

The Roadrunner represents the speed, fearlessness, and craftiness, as he always cleverly evades numerous encounters with the infamous coyote. Consistent with the idea of speed and craft is the jet plane soaring to the top of the patch, symbolizing flight and the aspirations of new careers.

This is the squadron's original patch.

Air Force Cadet Wing Squadron 33 "King Ratz" 
The patch is a white circle outlined in gold. Two black falcons, diving in formation, leave blue contrails. The black numeral "33" is located in the patch's upper right portion.

The two spacecraft-like falcons represent the mascot of the Air Force Academy, the bird of prey noted for its speed, keen eyesight and fierce fighting spirit. They fly in formation to show the teamwork of the members of the cadet wing and the Air Force.

This is the squadron's original patch.

Air Force Cadet Wing Squadron 34 "Loose Hawgs" 
The patch is a circle with a gold border. The top half of the background is blue with a white "34" in the upper tight. The lower half of the field has alternating red and white stripes converging at the center of the patch. A gray A-10 Thunderbolt II with a P-47 Thunderbolt immediately below it dominates the center. A bolt of lightning, gold with a white border, extends from the upper left to the lower right. A gray and purple armored hand holds the bolt, and Polaris lies immediately below the hand.

The dominant colors represent the four classes at the Air Force Academy. Though both aircraft are nicknamed "Thunderbolt," the A-10 symbolizes the modern American Air Force while the P-47 serves as a reminder of its rich heritage. The thunderbolt shows the strength and power of the Air Force, and the arm poised to throw the thunderbolt serves as a warning to potential aggressors that America is ready and willing to use military might to maintain its freedom and society.

The thunderbolt patch, the squadron's third, was designed by Tracy M. Murakami, and approved for use in September 1981.

Air Force Cadet Wing Squadron 35 "Wild Weasels" 
The patch is royal blue circle with a black border. A white, brown and black weasel flies two white and black AGM-78 Standard missiles. The weasel's eyes, mouth and gloves are bright red as is the Arabic numeral "35" on the left central position of the emblem. Groups of three and five gold stars are at the top left of the patch. The aggressive weasel holds a gold thunderbolt in the one gloved hand and a flight control stick in the other.

This patch continues the theme of its forerunner a tribute to the F-105 pilots who flew Wild Weasel on surface-to-air suppression missions in the Vietnam War. The lightning bolt signifies the speed of the Air Force strike capability. The weasel depicts the determination, skill, and adeptness of the Air Force aviator.

This third patch for the 35th Squadron was authorized on Sept. 29, 1983, after approval by General Dynamics Corporation, the manufacturer of the missiles.

Air Force Cadet Wing Squadron 36 "Proud Pink Panthers" 
The patch, a gray circle with a black border, has in its center the "Pink Panther" outlined in black. He wears a blue flight jacket with a second lieutenant's insignia and holds a white helmet. He leans against the yellow and black numeral "36."

The Pink Panther depicts the cunning and sophistication every cadet strives for during his cadet career. The flight jacket, helmet and gold bars symbolize the cadet's two most immediate goals: a commission as a second lieutenant and a flying career. The fact that the panther is leaning against the "36" signifies that a cadet depends on the other members of the squadron.

This is the squadron's original patch. The Pink Panther was chosen to adorn the squadron patch because of his popularity as a Saturday morning cartoon character.

Air Force Cadet Wing Squadron 37 "Animalistic Skyraiders" 
The current patch is yet another in the evolution of the squadron's emblem and, technically, another color variation of the original. Its predominant color is royal blue, with gold bordering the circle. In the center, a gray knight with a blue shield, a red and white coronet, and a winged helmet is mounted on a large, gray and white stallion. The knight holds a silver, white and gray lance. A large, cratered, sliver moon and the red numeral "37" are in the upper right hand area. Gold is used for the knight's spur, the saddle girth and the horse's front hoof.

The patch reflects the bold, decisive nature of the 37th Squadron. The mounted warrior symbolizes strength, integrity, and courage while its unbridled stallion represents relentless spirit and freedom. The full moon, a mirror of the future, signifies determination to advance. The warrior's lance, pointed outward, represents the outward-looking views of the squadron. The double-edged blade shows determination to uphold tradition while improving the present and looking to the future.

This variation, the third major color change, has been used since 1976.

It is possible to find examples of this patch without the red on the knight's coronet or headband.

Air Force Cadet Wing Squadron 38 "All-Stars" 
The patch, shaped like a shield and outlined in black, has five white stars on a blue background in its upper portion. The nickname "ALL STARS" leaves blue contrails as it flares from the red and white vertical stripes of the lower portion. The blue numeral "38" sits to the upper left of the nickname.

The patch resembles the American flag and the Air Force shield and symbolizes the qualities of patriotism, courage and devotion to duty. "ALL STARS" is testimony to the excellence with which each squadron member performs his duties and responsibilities. The five stars stand for the five ideals of the squadron: character, discipline, devotion to duty, excellence and pride.

This second patch of the squadron was approved in 1972.

Air Force Cadet Wing Squadron 39 "Jedi Knights"
The patch, a rectangle edged in red, spotlights a gray X-wing space fighter with a single red stripe. This is a fictional spacecraft like those from George Lucas' Star Wars movies. The fighter rockets around a dark blue planet and leaves a gold flame in its wake. The right side background is the black of space, while the left side field is part of the blue planet. A large red "39," followed by a smaller gray "JEDI," is in the upper left side.

The X-wing, a versatile starfighter that balances speed with firepower, zooms across the patch. Like their Star Wars namesake, the cadets of the 39th are highly skilled, self-disciplined, courageous, and dedicated to defending and protecting justice and freedom. The X-wing flies through the endless fields of space to represent the unlimited capabilities of each member within the squadron. The stars seen spread across the patch are meant to signify how graduates of the squadron may be spread around the world but will always have the squadron as a place to call home.

Air Force Cadet Wing Squadron 40 "Warhawks" 
The sky blue patch is an odd diamond shape edged in black. Along the bottom edge, against a gray background, are the black words "CLOSING FOR THE KILL." In the top corner, a red sun has four red sunbeams protruding outward. Inside the sun is the Roman numeral "XL." A camouflaged P-40 Warhawk with a tigershark mouth dominates. The aircraft fires six .50 caliber machine guns, and in the background a black enemy aircraft falls out of the sky, leaving a trail of black smoke.

The patch's four colors represent the Air Force Academy classes. The red sun and the "XL" link the present and future members of the 40th Squadron when it was called "ALI BABA AND THE FORTY THIEVES." The Warhawk links the squadron with the heritage and glory of the Air Force and the men who fought and died in the early years of air combat. Men who fought in P-40 were quick-thinking, fun-loving, dedicated, and courageous.

This second squadron patch replaced the "ALI BABA" one near the end of the '86-'87 academic year.

Class exemplar
During the fall semester of the third-class (sophomore) year, the AFCW cadets choose a class exemplar who becomes the class' honorary namesake. The exemplar is typically a deceased former member of the Air Force or Army Air Force, with a few notable exceptions like the Wright Brothers and Neil Armstrong. The tradition began with the Class of 2000. The selection of the class exemplar is celebrated with a class-wide dinner.

See also
 United States Air Force Academy
 United States Air Force Academy Cadet Insignia
 United States Air Force Academy, the Core of Cadet Life: Squadrons
 Cadet Wing Commander (AFCW/CC)
 Cadet Wing Director of Operations (AFCW/DO)

References

United States Air Force Academy